General Perera may refer to:

Denis Perera (1930–2013), Sri Lanka Army general
Janaka Perera (1946–2008), Sri Lanka Army major general
Sumedha Perera (fl. 1970s–2010s), Sri Lanka Army major general

See also
General Periera (disambiguation)